Axinidris is a genus of arboreal ants in the subfamily Dolichoderinae. The genus is known from forested areas the Afrotropics, where they nest in hollow stems or rotten wood. They forage mainly in trees, but occasionally on the ground.

Species

Axinidris acholli Weber, 1941
Axinidris bidens Shattuck, 1991
Axinidris denticulata (Wheeler, 1922)
Axinidris gabonica Snelling, 2007
Axinidris ghanensis Shattuck, 1991
Axinidris hylekoites Shattuck, 1991
Axinidris hypoclinoides (Santschi, 1919)
Axinidris icipe Snelling, 2007
Axinidris kakamegensis Shattuck, 1991
Axinidris kinoin Shattuck, 1991
Axinidris lignicola Snelling, 2007
Axinidris luhya Snelling, 2007
Axinidris mlalu Snelling, 2007
Axinidris murielae Shattuck, 1991
Axinidris namib Snelling, 2007
Axinidris nigripes Shattuck, 1991
Axinidris occidentalis Shattuck, 1991
Axinidris okekai Snelling, 2007
Axinidris palligastrion Shattuck, 1991
Axinidris stageri Snelling, 2007
Axinidris tridens (Arnold, 1946)

References

External links

 
Dolichoderinae
Ant genera
Hymenoptera of Africa